Irene Solà Sáez (born 17 August 1990) is a Catalan writer and an artist. She has exhibited her work at the CCCB in Barcelona and the Whitechapel Gallery in London. Her first book of poems, Bèstia won the 2012 Amadeu Oller Prize and her novel Els dics, the 2017 Documenta Prize. 

She has a degree in fine arts from the University of Barcelona and a master's in literature, film and visual culture from the University of Sussex. Her first book of poems, Bèstia (Galerada, 2012), was awarded the Amadeu Oller Poetry Prize and has been translated into English (as Beast, Shearsman Books, 2017). Her first novel, Els dics (The Dams, L'Altra Editorial, 2018), won the Documenta prize and was awarded a grant for literary creation by the Catalan Department of Culture. In 2018, she was a resident writer at the Alan Cheuse International Writers Center of George Mason University (Virginia, United States) and in late 2019 she was selected to participate in the Art Omi: Writers Ledig House programme (New York). 

In 2019, she was awarded the Premi Llibres Anagrama de Novel·la for Canto jo i la muntanya balla (When I Sing, Mountains Dance). The same year, she also received the Núvol Prize, and the Cálamo Prize for the Spanish edition of the book. In 2020, she won the European Union Prize for Literature and the Maria Àngels Anglada Prize. In 2022 the book was also shortlisted for the Warwick Prize for Women in Translation.

Works
 Canto jo i la muntanya balla (Barcelona: Anagrama, 2019)
 When I Sing, Mountains Dance, translated by Mara Faye Lethem (Graywolf Press, 2022)
 Els dics (L'Altra Editorial, 2018)
 Bèstia (Galerada, 2012)
 Beast, translated by Oscar Holloway (Shearsman Books, 2017)

References

Further reading
 Interview with Irene Solà and Mara Faye Lethem, the translator of her work, The Rumpus
 Conversation Between Irene Solà and author Eva Baltasar, Granta

 

Living people
1990 births
Writers from Catalonia
Women writers from Catalonia
University of Barcelona alumni
Alumni of the University of Sussex
Catalan-language writers